Wilder Arthur Simpson (May 22, 1887 – March 31, 1971) was an American politician who served in both houses of the Vermont General Assembly. He ran for governor in 1930, 1932, 1944, and 1960 but was usuccessful in the Republican primary each time. Known as Vermont's "Mr. Republican," he supported a number of Democratic candidates later in life, including Philip H. Hoff.

Simpson married the former Ruth Hoffman on July 24, 1912. Together they had one son and three daughters.

References

1887 births
1971 deaths
Republican Party members of the Vermont House of Representatives